The 2012 Tostitos Fiesta Bowl was a postseason college football bowl game played at University of Phoenix Stadium in Glendale, Arizona. The Oklahoma State Cowboys, champions of the Big 12 Conference, played the Stanford Cardinal, an at-large selection from the Pac-12 Conference. Oklahoma State won the game, 41–38, in overtime.

Originally this game was scheduled for January 5 pending resolution of the 2011 NFL lockout and a possible Monday Night Football game on January 2. However, with the resolution of the lockout, the game was moved to the spot following the 2012 Rose Bowl. The game aired on ESPN.

Teams
This game was the first meeting between the two teams.

Oklahoma State

Big 12 champion Oklahoma State made their first ever trip to a BCS bowl game.
Oklahoma State ranked second in passing offense (386.25 yards per game), scoring offense (49.33 points), turnover margin (1.67) during the season, and turnovers (42). The Cowboy offense featured the combination of quarterback Brandon Weeden and wide receiver Justin Blackmon, both of whom were taken in the first round of the 2012 NFL Draft. Weeden in 12 games, completed 379 of 522 passes for 4,328 yards while Blackmon caught 113 passes for 1,336 yards. Oklahoma State was not selected for the National Championship game, after being upset by Iowa State just a few weeks earlier.

Stanford

Stanford has a 5–7 record against the Big 12 Conference teams (1–0 Kansas; 1–0 Missouri; 1–4 Oklahoma; 2–2 Texas; 0–1 Texas A&M). Stanford played in the 2009 Sun Bowl and lost to Oklahoma 31–27. Prior to its loss to Oregon on November 12, the Cardinal were winners of its first nine games of the season and 17 in a row. The team ranked second in the conference and 22nd nationally in rushing offense (207.92 yards per game), led by All-American Quarterback Andrew Luck, who was the first player selected in the 2012 NFL Draft.

Game Summary

Scoring summary

Statistics

References

Fiesta Bowl
Fiesta Bowl
Oklahoma State Cowboys football bowl games
Stanford Cardinal football bowl games
Fiesta Bowl
January 2012 sports events in the United States